The BBC One Balloon idents were a series of idents (station identifications) used on the British TV channel BBC One from 4 October 1997 to 28 March 2002. The balloon theme replaced the computer-generated spinning globe that had been used as the main ident on the channel since 1991. It launched on the same day as a BBC-wide rebrand, and thus the new idents also carried the new BBC logo. The channel's name also changed from BBC1 to BBC One. This was the last ident set used by the channel when it fully closed down; the last proper closedown took place in the early hours of 9 November 1997. Starting the following day, BBC News 24 (now the BBC News Channel) would broadcast on BBC One during closedown, which continues today.

The hot air balloon featured in the idents was filmed on location. The balloon was built by Cameron Balloons in 1997 and made its first flight that year, flying from the Bristol International Balloon Fiesta. It made its final flight in August 2002, also at the Bristol International Balloon Fiesta, and was subsequently retired and placed into storage. The balloon's flight certificate from the Civil Aviation Authority expired on 17 July 2003.

Launch
As part of a large relaunch of the BBC's corporate logo and the ident packages of BBC One and BBC Two, these new idents replaced the old virtual globe ident. London-based design agency Lambie-Nairn proposed new idents showcasing the balloons with the familiar globe design that would serve as "a visual metaphor underpinning the core thought: BBC One – bringing the whole world to every corner of the Nation."

The balloon idents were designed by Lambie-Nairn and the balloon was made in Bristol by Cameron Balloons. Its aircraft registration was "G-IBBC".

Components of idents
The idents featured a predominantly red balloon emblazoned with an orange world map and white clouds floating over various scenes of the British landscape. These colors were chosen because a balloon mimicking a traditional map's blue oceans and green land would have been more difficult to see against the natural scenery. The size of the balloon was originally proposed to be 100 ft. but was reduced to 60 ft. upon construction.

The idents featured a soundtrack of ambient music, with livelier versions being used for more industrial or recreational settings. The soundtrack was composed by English musician Phil Sawyer. This score made these idents the first regular BBC One idents to use music since Abram Games's "Bat's Wings" ident. The new BBC logo, along with the channel name "ONE" immediately to its right, was overlaid at the bottom of the screen. The new logo design was an attempt to unify all the BBC's services and brands under a single logo design, with the idents expressing the BBC's desire to "[reach] out to all corners of the land." From October 1998, the idents were shown on widescreen. The '888' tag was also phased out in July 1999, to be replaced with "Subtitles" following the uptake in digital television and the increased use of the new BBC Text service and the bbc.co.uk URL was added above the logo soon after.

The new-look also featured a clock, which used the same software and layout as before, and utilized the balloon canvas as the background. The clock was also retained following the change to widescreen. However, the software was changed so that the minute hand only moved once a minute, rather than every second as it had previously.

Promotions and static captions both featured text and logos centered for widescreen use, with the BBC One logo at the bottom of the screen and a color palette of mainly oranges and reds. However, colors varied according to theme and programme. The use of static captions was reduced slightly but remained a key part of continuity links.

Original locations
The original sequences were filmed over six weeks in June and July 1997 at different locations around the United Kingdom. From these locations, forty-seven different 35-second films were produced featuring the balloon floating serenely over British landscapes. Much of the photography was from a helicopter at heights of up to 3,500 ft. One noticeable and intentional aspect about the original balloon films was that none of the sequences featured people or any distinct human activity. The locations were:

 Eilean Donan Castle, Scottish Highlands
 Forth Rail Bridge, Scotland 
 London Docklands and One Canada Square
 River Thames
 Strangford Lough, Northern Ireland
 Grey Abbey, Northern Ireland
 Snowdonia National Park, Wales
 Cardiff City Hall, South Wales
 South Downs, Seaford, East Sussex
 Port of Felixstowe, Suffolk
 Swinside Stone Circle, Cumbria

Later additions
A year after launch in 1998, several more idents were created and added to the collection. The main difference between these new additions and the originals was that people were now included in some of the sequences. However, the balloon itself did actually fly over the following locations:

 Cley next the Sea, Norfolk
 Cerne Abbas Giant, Dorset *
 Angel of the North
 St Michael's Mount, Cornwall
 Blackpool Tower
 The Needles, Isle of Wight
 Second Severn Crossing, Wales
 Brecon Beacons,  South Wales *
 Dunluce Castle, Northern Ireland
 Giant's Causeway, Northern Ireland *
 Scottish Exhibition and Conference Centre, Glasgow, Scotland
 Ballachulish, Scotland *
 Edinburgh, Scotland *

Note:  places marked with * were used in short "stings" between programs.

In 2000, the BBC wanted the balloon idents to become more inclusive, so they introduced "lifestyle" idents. These featured skateboarders, a busy market scene and a carnival, all of which featured the balloon flying past in the background. A bungee jumper was also filmed jumping out of the balloon.

Special idents
There were also many special idents made for new programs, sporting events and, most notably, the Christmas holiday. These included:

Christmas

Other

Replacement
On 1 November 2000, Lorraine Heggessey became controller of BBC One and immediately ordered a review of the channel's branding. In her opinion, the balloon was "slow and distant". On 29 March (Good Friday) 2002, after much speculation, the balloon idents were replaced as the icon of BBC One with a set of idents with the theme of Rhythm & Movement, making it the final motif of the globe logo for the channel after 39 years. English 12 was the final ident aired before BBC News 24 at 2.15 am in the late evening hours of 28 March 2002 on the England version of BBC One. Northern Ireland had a 35-second tribute of the idents before signing off. 

The balloon itself last took to the skies in the summer of 2002 when it took part in the Bristol International Balloon Fiesta. It is now in the care of the Sussex-based Balloon Preservation Group. In early 2023, plans were announced for the balloon to be flown for the first time in over two decades, to test its condition, with an appearance at the Midlands Air Festival in Alcester scheduled for later in the year.

Reception
The idents were well received by viewers and have a loyal fan base to this day.

BBC America
The balloon idents were also shown on BBC America between 1998 and 2001. Unlike BBC One, BBC America employed shorter, snappier cuts of various balloon sequences with slight changes to the familiar musical score.

See also

 History of BBC television idents

References

External links
 BBC One
 Lambie-Nairn design agency
 BBC One "Balloon" idents at TV Ark

BBC One
BBC Idents
Balloons (aeronautics)
Television presentation in the United Kingdom